2,5-Dimethoxy-4-trifluoromethylamphetamine (DOTFM) is a psychedelic drug of the phenethylamine and amphetamine chemical classes. It was first synthesized in 1994 by a team at Purdue University led by David E. Nichols. DOTFM is the alpha-methylated analogue of 2C-TFM, and is around twice as potent in animal studies. It acts as an agonist at the 5HT2A and 5HT2C receptors.  In drug-substitution experiments in rats, DOTFM fully substituted for LSD and was slightly more potent than DOI.

See also 
 DOx

References 

Substituted amphetamines
Trifluoromethyl compounds
2,5-Dimethoxyphenethylamines
Substances discovered in the 1990s